Joe Tea is a Montclair, New Jersey based producer of iced tea and potato chips founded in 1998 by Steven Prato. The tea is known for its all-natural taste and retro logo.

History
Steven and Ann Prato started Joe Tea in the summer of 1998 and sold the product to local stores in Hoboken and the Jersey Shore. The store expanded to wholesale distribution and in a few years supplied the New York metropolitan area.

By 2012, the company had expanded distribution to Chile, Japan, China, Korea, Indonesia, Brazil, Canada and Britain.

By 2017, the company has expanded to over 20 countries worldwide.

References

External links
 

Companies based in Essex County, New Jersey
Food and drink companies established in 1998
Iced tea brands
American companies established in 1998
1998 establishments in New Jersey
Upper Montclair, New Jersey
Food and drink companies based in New Jersey